Man of La Mancha is a 1972 film adaptation of the Broadway musical Man of La Mancha by Dale Wasserman, with music by Mitch Leigh and lyrics by Joe Darion. The musical was suggested by the classic novel Don Quixote by Miguel de Cervantes, but more directly based on Wasserman's 1959 non-musical television play I, Don Quixote, which combines a semi-fictional episode from the life of Cervantes with scenes from his novel.

Though financed by Italian producer Alberto Grimaldi and shot in Rome, the film is in English, with all principal actors either British or American, excepting Loren. (Gino Conforti, the Barber, is an American of Italian descent.) The film was released by United Artists and is known in Italy as L'Uomo della Mancha.

Produced and directed by Arthur Hiller, the film stars Peter O'Toole as both Miguel de Cervantes and Don Quixote, James Coco as both Cervantes' manservant and Don Quixote's "squire" Sancho Panza, and Sophia Loren as scullery maid and prostitute Aldonza, whom the delusional Don Quixote idolizes as Dulcinea. Gillian Lynne staged the choreography and fight scenes.

Plot

Cervantes and his manservant have been imprisoned by the Spanish Inquisition, and a manuscript by Cervantes is seized by his fellow inmates, who subject him to a mock trial in order to determine whether the manuscript should be returned. Cervantes' defense is in the form of a play, in which Cervantes takes the role of Alonso Quijano, an old gentleman who has lost his mind and now believes that he should go forth as a knight-errant. Quijano renames himself Don Quixote de La Mancha and sets out to find adventures with his "squire", Sancho Panza.

Cast
 Peter O'Toole (Simon Gilbert, singing) as Don Quixote de la Mancha / Miguel de Cervantes / Alonso Quijano
 Sophia Loren as Dulcinea / Aldonza
 James Coco as Sancho Panza / Cervantes' manservant
 Harry Andrews (Brian Blessed, singing) as The Innkeeper / The Governor
 John Castle as Sanson Carrasco / The Duke
 Ian Richardson as The Padre
 Brian Blessed as Pedro
 Julie Gregg as Antonia Quijano
 Rosalie Crutchley as The Housekeeper
 Gino Conforti as The Barber
 Marne Maitland as Captain of the Guard
 Dorothy Sinclair as The Innkeeper's wife
 Miriam Acevedo as Fermina

Production
In 1967, United Artists paid more than $2.25 million for rights to the show, the second most ever paid, behind the $5.5 million that Warner Bros. paid for the rights to My Fair Lady. In addition to the initial outlay, UA agreed to pay 25% of the gross if the gross exceeded 2.5 times the negative cost plus $0.5 million for album sales. According to both associate producer Saul Chaplin (in his memoir The Golden Age of Movie Musicals and Me) and Dale Wasserman (in his memoir The Impossible Musical), the film had a troubled production history. Originally, Wasserman, composer Mitch Leigh – serving as associate producer – and Albert Marre, who had directed the original show but had never before directed a film, were hired to make the motion picture, and original cast stars Richard Kiley and Joan Diener were screen tested in anticipation of the two actors repeating their stage roles. Because of Marre's inexperience with moviemaking, however, he (according to Wasserman) used up part of the film's budget on screen tests, which angered the UA executives. Marre was fired, and as a result Wasserman, Leigh, Kiley and Diener, who was married to Marre, also left the project. British director Peter Glenville was then brought in (it was he who cast Peter O'Toole as Cervantes and Quixote), but was in turn also fired when it was learned that he planned to eliminate most of the songs. It was then that Arthur Hiller and Saul Chaplin joined the project. Hiller re-hired Wasserman to adapt his own stage libretto, although, according to Wasserman, the film's new opening sequence, showing the actual arrest of Cervantes before he enters the prison, was not by him. Writer John Hopkins, who most likely wrote the scene Wasserman refers to, had been brought in by Glenville, and had left when Glenville was fired.  However, it has never been made clear whether it was Glenville or Hiller who cast non-singing actors Sophia Loren, Harry Andrews, and Rosalie Crutchley in the film, it might have been Glenville, since he had tried to eliminate the songs and envisioned the film as a non-musical. Glenville had also previously worked with arranger/conductor Laurence Rosenthal.

According to the Turner Classic Movies website, O'Toole had been eager to work with Glenville, a friend of his, on the film and make it as a "straight" non-musical drama, but was highly displeased when Glenville was fired and replaced by Arthur Hiller, referring to him constantly as "little Arthur". However, according to Saul Chaplin's autobiography, O'Toole, who could not sing, assisted in the search for a voice double when he realized the film would indeed be a musical after all, eventually finding Simon Gilbert.  In his autobiography Absolute Pandemonium, Brian Blessed claims to have dubbed the singing voice of Harry Andrews as well as appearing onscreen as Pedro.

Although most of the roles in the film were played by British Shakespearean actors who were not noted for singing ability, Ian Richardson did go on to be nominated for a Tony for his performance as Henry Higgins in the 20th anniversary production of My Fair Lady, and the picture did feature several actors, among them Julie Gregg, Gino Conforti, and the muleteer chorus, who did have singing voices. Gino Conforti had been a member of the original stage production cast, and Julie Gregg had also appeared on Broadway in a musical.

Saul Chaplin also explains in his book that the sets and costumes, designed by Luciano Damiani, had already been made by the time that he and Hiller were brought in to work on the film, which meant that Hiller could not have them altered. Damiani was one of Italy's most noted stage designers, having worked on plays and operas in Italy, and on a made-for-television film of Cavalleria Rusticana, but this was the only theatrical motion picture for which he designed the sets and costumes.

Changes for screen
Two changes are made to the storyline of the stage musical: first is the reason for Cervantes' imprisonment. The play begins with Cervantes and his manservant entering the dungeon, after which we learn that Cervantes incurred the wrath of the Inquisition by issuing a lien on a monastery that would not pay its taxes. But in the film's opening scene, we see a colorful festival in the town square, during which Cervantes stages a play that openly lampoons the Inquisition, thereby leading to his arrest on the spot. He and his manservant are then taken to the prison. (In contrast to the real-life Cervantes, arrested for unpaid financial debts and sentenced to debtors' prison; though serving several jail terms, he was never found guilty of a crime. Cervantes was later excommunicated for "excessive zeal" in securing provisions for the Spanish Armada: gathering corn from Church storehouses.)

The second change from the stage original occurs when the priest and Dr. Carrasco are sent to bring Quixote back home. In the stage version, they arrive at the inn and simply try to reason with him, but he pays no attention. The film depicts an elaborate ruse plotted by Quixote's family. A man is brought in on a bier, apparently "turned to stone" through some enchantment. The disguised family members implore Don Quixote to break the spell by fighting the Enchanter; Carrasco later portrays the Enchanter among a squad of mirror-wielding knights.

Two songs were omitted from the film: "What Does He Want of Me?" and "To Each His Dulcinea", as were verses of "Aldonza" and the deathbed reprise of "Dulcinea". Lyrics were partially rewritten for "It's All The Same" and "I Really Like Him". Aldonza's vocal range is soprano in the stage version, changed to contralto in the film to match Loren's vocal range.

Reception
On Rotten Tomatoes the film has an approval rating of 47% based on reviews from fifteen critics.

The fact that the film had gone through several directors and screenwriters, and that Peter O'Toole and Sophia Loren, who were not singers, had replaced Richard Kiley and Joan Diener in the leading roles, may have influenced the critics' reactions to the film at the time. Upon release, and for several years afterward, the film of Man of La Mancha received overwhelmingly negative reviews, notably from Time Magazine, which not only did not consider the film worthy of a full-length review, but even threw in some criticism of the original stage production into the bargain. They referred to the film as being "epically vulgar", and called the song The Impossible Dream "surely the most mercilessly lachrymose hymn to empty-headed optimism since Carousel'''s "You'll Never Walk Alone." Newsweek, in its review, opined that "the whole production is basted in the cheapest sentiment. Everyone gets a chance to cry over poor Don Quixote". Leonard Maltin still gives the film a BOMB rating in his annual Movie and Video Guide, stating "Beautiful source material has been raped, murdered and buried".

Roger Ebert, who gave the film two stars, mistakenly assumed that Peter O'Toole sang his own songs in the film, and wrote of him: "What favor were they doing us when they let us hear Peter O'Toole sing? Richard Harris is better, and he's no good. He can't sing, that is, but at least he can read lyrics. O'Toole masticates them."

His colleague, Gene Siskel, had this to say upon its premiere in Chicago: 

On the other hand, Vincent Canby of The New York Times stated that the film was "beautifully acted", and both Peter O'Toole and James Coco received Golden Globe nominations for their performances. The film, according to Dale Wasserman in his autobiography The Impossible Musical, fared well financially in its first week, but ultimately did poorly at the box office. And although Wasserman praised O'Toole and Loren's acting, he nevertheless strongly disliked the film, calling it "exaggerated" and "phony" in an online video interview made shortly before his death. Over the last few years, however, the film's reputation has somewhat improved.

Having been released in the middle of the Christmas season of 1972, the film continued its theatrical run well into 1973 and earned an estimated $3.8 million in North American rentals.

Awards and nominations
Nominated
 Academy Award for Original Song Score and Adaptation – Laurence Rosenthal
 Golden Globe Award for Best Actor – Motion Picture Musical or Comedy – Peter O'Toole
 Golden Globe Award for Best Supporting Actor – Motion Picture – James Coco

Won
 National Board of Review of Motion Pictures Award for Best Actor - Peter O'Toole (also for The Ruling Class). In addition, the board selected Man of La Mancha as one of the Ten Best Films of 1972.

Home mediaMan of La Mancha'' was released by MGM Home Video on May 11, 2004, as a Region 1 widescreen DVD, then as region A/1 Blu-ray on April 25, 2017.

See also

 List of American films of 1972

References

External links
 
 
 
 
 

1972 films
1972 comedy-drama films
1970s musical films
Italian comedy-drama films
Italian fantasy films
American adventure films
American comedy-drama films
American fantasy films
American musical films
English-language Italian films
Films about writers
Films based on musicals
Films based on Don Quixote
Films directed by Arthur Hiller
Films set in Spain
Films set in the 1590s
Films set in the 1600s
Films shot in Italy
United Artists films
Films produced by Alberto Grimaldi
Cultural depictions of Miguel de Cervantes
Films based on adaptations
Films scored by Laurence Rosenthal
1970s English-language films
1970s American films
1970s Italian films